Emily James Smith Putnam (15 April 1865 – 1944) was an American classical scholar, author and educator.

Biography
She was the daughter of Justice James C. Smith. She graduated from Bryn Mawr College in 1889 and studied at Girton College, Cambridge University, in 1889–90.

She was teacher of Greek at the Packer Collegiate Institute, Brooklyn, in 1891–93. She was a fellow in Greek at the University of Chicago in 1893–94, and dean of Barnard College in 1894–1900. She was a trustee of Barnard College in 1900–05, and president of the League for Political Education (co-founded by her sister-in-law Mary Putnam Jacobi) In 1901–04. She was vice-president and manager of the Women's University Club, New York City, in 1907–11.

She married George Haven Putnam in 1899.

Works
 Selections from Lucian (1891)
 The Lady (1910)
 Greek Religion (1913)

Notes

References
 

Attribution

1865 births
1944 deaths
American women writers
Bryn Mawr College alumni
American classical scholars
Women classical scholars
Classical scholars of the University of Chicago